The following highways have been numbered 925:

Costa Rica
 National Route 925

United States